Frosty's Winter Wonderland is a 1976 animated Christmas television special and a standalone sequel to the 1969 special Frosty the Snowman, produced by Rankin/Bass Productions and animated by Topcraft. It is the second television special featuring the character Frosty the Snowman. It returns writer Romeo Muller, character designer Paul Coker, Jr., music composer Maury Laws and actor Jackie Vernon as the voice of Frosty, while Andy Griffith stars as the narrator (replacing Jimmy Durante, who had been incapacitated by a stroke three years prior and retired from acting) with the rest of the cast consisting of Shelley Winters, Dennis Day, and Paul Frees. The special premiered on ABC on December 2, 1976.

Plot
Years after Frosty left for the North Pole, the children long for the snowman's return after the first snowfall of the season. Meanwhile, at the North Pole, Frosty, who is equally lonesome for the children, hears of the snowfall and decides to return. The children are overjoyed when Frosty comes back to play with them, but then Jack Frost sees the fun that the children are having with Frosty and becomes jealous of him. When he learns the origin of Frosty and his magic silk top hat which brought the snowman to life when placed on his head, Jack decides to steal it from Frosty so the children will love him more. But that night, while Frosty and the children are ice-skating at a frozen pond, Jack unknowingly and mistakenly captures a horse's old top hat with his ability to blow snowy winds. Believing it to be Frosty's top hat, he disappears with it.

However, Frosty becomes sad and lonely at the end of each day when the children go home for the night. At his friends' suggestion, Frosty decides to have a "snow wife" to keep him company; he helps the children build a snow wife for him, and they name her Crystal, but to their dismay, the group cannot find a way to bring Crystal to life. Late that night, Frosty presents Crystal with a bouquet of frost flowers. His gift of love brings her to life, and the two joyously frolic through the snow, until Jack uses a gust of icy wind which blows Frosty's top hat off, turning him back to his lifeless state and taunting Crystal that he is gone for good. To prove Jack wrong, she sculpts a corsage out of snow, places it on Frosty's chest and gives him a kiss which immediately brings him back to life. Befuddled by his reanimation, Jack throws Frosty's top hat back on his head in disgust.

Frosty and Crystal run through the town announcing their wedding to the children. The children recruit Parson Brown, the local preacher, to marry them, but Brown cannot perform the ceremony as he can only marry humans. To ensure the wedding still takes place, he assists the children in building a "snow parson" whom he brings to life with his Bible. When Jack decides to spoil the wedding with a blizzard, Frosty and Crystal decide to reason with him and ask for him to be the best man at the wedding. Finally feeling appreciated and accepted, Jack agrees, and Frosty and Crystal are finally married.

Frosty, Crystal, and Jack have fun with the children all winter, but they notice the weather is starting to grow warm again. Jack uses his powers to extend the winter to allow Frosty and Crystal to stay, but when Parson Brown warns them of the dangers of an everlasting winter, the three realize they must return to the North Pole. The group skates to the train station, and Frosty reunites with the traffic cop he met in the previous special, who is shocked to hear Frosty has a snow wife. Frosty, Crystal, and Jack board the train for the North Pole and bid farewell to their friends, and the three return to the town the following winter.

Cast
 Jackie Vernon as Frosty
 Shelley Winters as Crystal (also credited as Mrs. Frosty)
 Andy Griffith as Narrator
 Dennis Day as Parson Brown, Snow Parson
 Paul Frees as Jack Frost, Traffic Cop
 Shelly Hines as Elsie's brother
 Manfreed Olea as Child
 Eric Stern as Child
 Barbara Jo Ewing as Elsie
 The Wee Winter Singers as Children

Production credits
 Producers/Directors – Arthur Rankin Jr., Jules Bass
 Writer – Romeo Muller
 Based on the Song "Frosty the Snowman" – Steve Nelson, Jack Rollins © 1951 Hill & Range Songs
 "Winter Wonderland" – Dick Smith, Felix Bernard © 1934 Bregman Vocco and Conn, Inc.
 Sound – John Curcio, Don Hahn, Dave Iveland, Tom Clack
 Animation – Toru Hara, Tsuguyuki Kubo
 Key Animation – Kazuyuki Kobayashi
 Background Design – Minoru Nishida
 Design – Paul Coker, Jr.
 Music Arranger/Conductor – Maury Laws
Rankin/Bass Productions, Inc. All rights reserved. ©MCMLXXVI.

Television rights
The rights to this special are held by Warner Bros. Television Distribution via Telepictures, which used to license the show to Freeform. The latter aired the special annually on its "25 Days of Christmas" marathon. In 2018, AMC took over the license for the special.

Because the ownership of the television rights to the Rankin/Bass library was split into two parts (one including all productions prior to 1974 and one including all productions from that point onward) after the company's dissolution in 1987, Frosty's Winter Wonderland was separated from the original Frosty the Snowman special. The telecast rights to the original are now held by CBS, who produced a companion sequel of its own, Frosty Returns, with a totally different cast, style and production staff.

Home media
Frosty's Winter Wonderland was first released on a compilation VHS tape with the 1981 special The Leprechauns' Christmas Gold by Vestron Video's Lightning Video label in 1985. The same double-feature release was also available in Australia in 1989. Warner Home Video/Warner Bros. Family Entertainment (owners of the post-1973 Rankin-Bass Productions library) distributed the special for its second VHS release in 1992, and also released it on DVD in 2004 paired with the 1974 special 'Twas the Night Before Christmas. The DVD was re-released in 2011.

Culture
In the 1998 Warner Bros. film Jack Frost, Charlie Frost (Joseph Cross) shows his father Jack Frost (Michael Keaton) some scenes from the special while changing television channels.

See also
 List of Christmas films

References

External links

1976 animated films
1976 films
1976 in American television
1976 television specials
1970s American animated films
1970s American television specials
1970s fantasy comedy films
1970s Christmas comedy films
1970s supernatural films
American Broadcasting Company television specials
American Christmas comedy films
American children's animated fantasy films
American fantasy comedy films
1970s animated television specials
Christmas television specials
Television shows directed by Jules Bass
Television shows directed by Arthur Rankin Jr.
Films scored by Maury Laws
Frosty the Snowman television specials
Rankin/Bass Productions television specials
Topcraft
American supernatural comedy films
Supernatural fantasy films
Television shows written by Romeo Muller
American Christmas television specials
Animated Christmas television specials